Lomanthang is a rural municipality in Mustang district in Gandaki Province of western Nepal. It is located at the northern end of the district, bordering the Tibet Autonomous Region of China to the north and Dalome rural municipality of Mustang in the south.

Lo is the northern two-thirds of Mustang district, culturally and linguistically influenced by Tibet, while the southern third is called Thak, the homeland of Thakali people who speak a different language and have a synthesis of Tibetan and Nepalese culture. The paintings show Newari influence, dating to approximately the 13th century, and also contain Tibetan scripts executed in ink, silver and gold and pre-Christian era pottery shards. Explorers found stupas, decorative art and paintings depicting various forms of the Buddha, often with disciples, supplicants and attendants, with some mural paintings showing sub-tropical themes containing palm trees, billowing Indian textiles and birds.

History
Lo Manthang was the walled capital of the Kingdom of Lo from its founding in 1380 by Ame Pal who oversaw construction of the city wall and many of the still-standing structures. After the Shahs of Gorkha forged Nepal out of numerous petty kingdoms in the 18th century, Lo became a dependency but kept its hereditary rulers. This arrangement continued as long as Nepal remained a kingdom, until the country was declared a republic in 2008 and Jigme Dorje Palbar Bista (c.1933–2016) was stripped of his title. His protector King Gyanendra suffered the same fate, however the raja or gyelpo of Mustang was 25th in a direct line of rulers dating back to 1380 AD. Gyanendra was only the eleventh Shah ruler since Prithvi Narayan Shah conquered Kathmandu in 1768.

More prosaically, Lo Manthang became a village development committee in Mustang district of Dhawalagiri zone. The 1991 census counted 876 people living in 178 households in the VDC. The population includes ethnic Lhobas.

Administration 
The rural municipality is divided into 5 wards.

Previously Lomanthang was a village development committee which was upgraded into a rural municipality merging adjoining VDCs of Chhoser and Chhonhup. The rural municipality came into existence on 10 March 2017, fulfilling the requirement of the new Constitution of Nepal 2015 when the Ministry of Federal Affairs and General Administration replaced all old VDCs and municipalities into 753 new local level bodies.

Transport 

The Government of Nepal has built a road north along the Kali Gandaki River, to within  of Lo Manthang.

Tourism and access
The village is noted for its tall whitewashed mud-brick walls, gompas and the Raja's or Royal or King's Palace, a nine-cornered, five-story structure built around 1400. There are four major temples: Jampa Lhakhang or Jampa Gompa, the oldest, built in the early 15th century and also known as the "God house"; Thubchen Gompa, a huge, red assembly hall and gompa built in the late 15th century and located just southwest of Jampa Gompa; Chodey Gompa, now the main city gompa; and the Choprang Gompa, which is popularly known as the "New Gompa".

Even though foreign visitors have been allowed in the kingdom since 1992, tourism to Upper Mustang remains limited, with just over 2000 foreign tourists in 2008.

The Nepalese Department of Immigration requires foreign visitors to obtain a special permit, which costs $50 per day per person, and liaison (guide) to protect local tradition from outside influence as well as to protect their environment.

2015 Earthquake
The April 2015 Nepal earthquake caused multiple cracks in the 600-year-old Lo Manthang Royal Palace.

Gallery

See also
Upper Mustang
Mustang District
Mustang Caves
Kali Gandaki River

References

Bibliography
Maïe Kitamura, La cité fortifiée de Lo Manthang, Mustang, Nord du Népal. Paris, Éditions Recherches, 2011. 214 plans & drawings, photography. .

External links

UN map of the municipalities of Mustang District
Restoring a temple on Nova (series)
Lo-manthang Photo Gallery

Rural municipalities in Mustang District
Populated places in Mustang District
China–Nepal border crossings
Hill stations in Nepal
Rural municipalities of Nepal established in 2017